Uscana or Hyscana was a settlement of the Illyrian tribe of the Penestae in southern Illyria, modern Albania.

See also 
 List of settlements in Illyria

References 

Cities in ancient Illyria
Illyrian Albania
Former populated places in the Balkans